Donald J. Ford (born December 31, 1952) is a former American basketball power forward in the National Basketball Association (NBA) for the Los Angeles Lakers and Cleveland Cavaliers. He also was a member of the Auxilium Torino in Europe. He played college basketball at the University of California, Santa Barbara.

Early years
Ford attended Santa Barbara High School. He was a teammate of future NBA player Keith Wilkes (later Jamaal Wilkes). He enrolled at Santa Barbara City College. As a freshman in the 1971–1972 season, he contributed to a 26–6 record and a Western State Conference Championship. He averaged 22 points and 10 rebounds per game, including 3 contests with 29 points. He received first-team All-American honors by the California Junior College Federation.

He transferred to the University of New Mexico after his freshman season. As a sophomore, he was a backup, posting 6.9 points and 4.1 rebounds per contest.

He transferred to the University of California, Santa Barbara at the end of his sophomore season. As a junior, he sat out the season because of the NCAA's transfer rules. As a senior, he averaged 19.6 points (led the team), 8.4 rebounds (led the team) and 2.5 assists (second on the team).

Professional career
Ford was selected by the Los Angeles Lakers in the 6th round (92nd overall) of the 1975 NBA Draft. He spent four-and-a-half seasons with the team and was mostly known for his defense, while averaging 6.4 points and 3.6 rebounds per game.

In the 1979–80 championship season, his playing time was limited behind Jamaal Wilkes, Jim Chones and Spencer Haywood. On February 15, 1980, he was traded along with a 1980 1st round draft pick (#22-Chad Kinch) to the Cleveland Cavaliers, in exchange for Butch Lee and a 1982 1st round draft pick (#1-James Worthy).

On January 19, 1982, he was waived after being passed on the depth chart by Keith Herron. He played in 474 games, averaging 6.4 points, 3.6 rebounds and 1.4 assists.

In 1982, he signed with the Auxilium Torino in Italy's Lega Basket Serie A.

Personal life
In 1989, he was named assistant coach and director of community relations to the Santa Barbara Islanders of the Continental Basketball Association.

Ford was married to Patti Tate, sister of actress Sharon Tate. They had three children. He currently lives in Santa Barbara where he works as a real estate agent, as well as serving as color commentator on UCSB basketball radio broadcasts.

References

External links
NBA stats @ basketballreference.com
Don Ford profile @ lakersweb.com

1952 births
Living people
American expatriate basketball people in Italy
American men's basketball players
Basketball players from California
Cleveland Cavaliers players
Continental Basketball Association coaches
Los Angeles Lakers draft picks
Los Angeles Lakers players
New Mexico Lobos men's basketball players
Santa Barbara City Vaqueros men's basketball players
Small forwards
Sportspeople from Santa Barbara, California
UC Santa Barbara Gauchos men's basketball players